The Middle Permian Toroweap Formation is a thin, darker geologic unit, between the brighter colored units of the Kaibab Limestone above, and Coconino Sandstone below. It is a prominent unit in Grand Canyon, Arizona, USA, found through sections of the South Rim, Grand Canyon, and the North Rim, of the Kaibab Plateau; also the Kaibab's southeast extension to Cape Royal, the Walhalla Plateau. The Colorado River of the Grand Canyon makes its excursion from due-south to due-west around the Walhalla Plateau, as it enters the east end of the Grand Canyon's interior, Granite Gorge. The formation is also found in southeast Utah.

The Toroweap Formation is a darker unit of gypsum and shale; also sandstone. In photos the cliff-forming Kaibab and Coconino units, show the more erodable Toroweap Formation slope-forming accumulations upon the underlying Coconino Sandstone; likewise below the Coconino, the softer Hermit Formation is shown forming slopes, above the slope forming 'redbeds' of the Supai Group. Close-up views of the Toroweap will show the resistant sandstone sub-units as erosion resistant sections.

Cliffs of the Toroweap Formation can be found in Walnut Canyon National Monument, about 70 mi southeast of the Grand Canyon, and east of Flagstaff, Arizona.

Marine transgression, and continental wind-blown sand, laid down the three units of Kaibab, Toroweap, and Coconino. The oceanic sea came from the west, and receded and re-transgressed. The Coconino Sandstone being made of sand dunes, continental, means that near-shore Toroweap deposits, and off-shore Kaibab Limestone, can all have the same actual ages in different regions where they were deposited, (continental, near-shore, open sea). In Arizona, the Toroweap formation is found in two transgressions eastwards, with easternmost 'strand-lines' locating the shoreline, Toroweap west, and Coconino sand dunes or beach deposits, east.

Toroweap Overlook

Halfway through the Grand Canyon (north side of Colorado River), at Toroweap Valley, with Toroweap Lake (a playa lake), an outcrop, or point overlooks the West Grand Canyon section. It is the site of the Toroweap Fault. Nine miles to the west is the roughly parallel Hurricane Fault (of Hurricane Cliffs, of Arizona/Utah), the west fault, of the Uinkaret Mountains (Mount Trumbull Wilderness). An eastern fault section separates here, and goes north into Utah, passing the west side of the Kanab Plateau.

The Toroweap Overlook lies above the erosion resistant Tapeats Sandstone, near its west terminus in Grand Canyon. Southeast, across the river The Esplanade-(a regional section) is created, upon the erosion resistant Esplanade Sandstone, a resistant member of the Supai Group, (a unit above the Tapeats, but occurs on both the downside block, and upside block in the south side of the canyon, Colorado River); (The Esplanade is just upstream, with the Toroweap Fault forming its west flank). The Toroweap Overlook was visited in the 1800s by original photographers of the Grand Canyon.

Geologic sequence
The Permian geologic sequence common in the Grand Canyon:
 4-Kaibab Limestone
 3-Toroweap Formation
 2-Coconino Sandstone
 1B-Hermit Formation
 1A-Esplanade Sandstone (also considered upper unit of Supai Group, Pennsylvanian-Permian boundary)

See also
 Geology of the Grand Canyon area
 Stratigraphy
 Marine transgression

References

Citations

General sources 
 Arizona DeLorme Atlas & Gazetteer, 5th Edition, c. 2002, 76 pages, pp. 23, 24, 31, 32.
 Arizona Road & Recreation Atlas, Benchmark Maps, 2nd Edition, c. 1998, pp. 28–29, 62–63.
 Chronic, Halka. Roadside Geology of Arizona, c. 1983, 23rd printing, Mountain Press Publishing Co. 322 pages. pp. 229–232. (US 89A Marble Canyon – Fredonia), pp. 179–180. (softcover)
 Lucchitta, 2001. Hiking Arizona's Geology, Ivo Lucchitta, c 2001, Mountaineers's Books. (softcover)

External links 

Shale formations of the United States
Geologic formations of Arizona
Geologic formations of Nevada
Geologic formations of Utah
Natural history of the Grand Canyon
Colorado Plateau
Permian Arizona
Permian geology of Nevada
Permian geology of Utah
Cisuralian Series of North America